Helichrysum mollifolium is a species of plant from South Africa.

Description 
This plant has a terminal flowering stem with long white hairs. There are reduced leaves at the base. The small flowerheads are aggregated into a doubly compound inflorescence. The stems bearing the flowers are clearly visible. The flower bracts are golden brown.  It has a small root stock which produces narrow, rhizomes.

Similar species 
It can be distinguished from Helichrysum nudifolium by the soft leaves crowded at the base of the stem and the more golden-brown flower bracts.

It differs from Helichrysum miconiifolium in its soft flowering stem, five nerved leaves and blunt bracts around the flowers.

Distribution and habitat 
This plant is known from the KwaZulu Natal province of South Africa. It grows in moist areas in the Drakensberg, between Witsieshoek and Garden Castle. Its habitats include grassy depressions, near streams and the damp margins of forests.

Conservation 
As this species is widespread and currently well protected it is considered to be of least concern by the South African National Biodiversity Institute.

References 

Plants described in 1982
Flora of South Africa
Flora of KwaZulu-Natal
mollifolium